Masayuki Ishii (18 April 1929 – 12 February 2014) was a Japanese sailor. He competed at the 1960 Summer Olympics and the 1964 Summer Olympics.

References

External links
 

1929 births
2014 deaths
Japanese male sailors (sport)
Olympic sailors of Japan
Sailors at the 1960 Summer Olympics – Dragon
Sailors at the 1964 Summer Olympics – Star
Sportspeople from Kanagawa Prefecture
20th-century Japanese people